The North Highland Way (Scottish Gaelic: A Tuath na Gàidhealtachd dòigh) is a  hiking, cycling and horse riding trail in Scotland. It starts from Duncansby Head on the North East coast to Cape Wrath in the North West of Scotland's coast. The North Highland Way connects the Cape Wrath Trail (which opened in January, 2013) in the west with the Moray Firth trail in the east. The North Coast 500 is a driving route, which follows a similar line to the North Highland Way.

Route description 
The route of the North Highland Way varies in length due to the various options when it comes to walking this particular route. The terrain of the North Highland Way varies hugely, crossing beaches, forests, road and rough paths as well as some remote areas.

The start of the North Highland Way is located in Duncansby Head, the most north-easterly part of Scotland's mainland, looking out to the Orkney Isles. From Duncansby Head, the route continues west, along Scotland's North coast. This first section of the route passes through the town of John o' Groats and the Castle of Mey. The early stages of the North Highland Way also provide the opportunity to visit Dunnet Head, the most northerly point of the British mainland.

Further stages of the route follow Scotland's North Coast, passing through the towns of Strathy, Bettyhill and Tongue.

The route of the North Highland Way is broken into a number of section which are typically walked in 7, 10 or 13 days.  In 2020 there is a challenge on it to raise funds for Bransby Horses, a horse rescue centre in Lincolnshire. 
The official North Highland Way is now being updated with materials from the Highland Councils files and is no longer one person's interpretation of it. It was always intended as a multi use route, and the materials include routes for horses and cyclists under the Core Path Plan. The Thurso to Castletown route is the first section and is available on OS maps, together with the book.

Features 

 John o' Groats
 Castle of Mey
 Dunnet
 Murkle
 Thurso
 Reay
 House of Tongue
 Cape Wrath
 Cape Wrath Lighthouse

History 

The idea of a North Highland Way has its roots in a proposal for a Caithness Way, made in 1992 by a local group, the Caithness Waybaggers, which formed to pursue the project. The proposed  route would have started at Dunbeath harbour and run via Altnabreac railway station, Westerdale, Halkirk and Thurso to John o' Groats. However, the project met with concerns from farmers and land owners on the route, problems with accommodation and with paths, and suffered from a lack of support.

The idea was revived in 2010 with a proposal for a new  route from John o' Groats to Cape Wrath via Dunnet Head, Holborn Head, Strathy Point and Skerray. The area of the proposed route is one of the few areas of the Highlands to lack a branded distance walking path. An approach was made to the Highland Council and other public bodies seeking their support, and a survey of public opinion was conducted.

Tina Irving, secretary of the Dunnet Head Educational Trust and described by The Herald as "one of the driving forces behind the campaign", was quoted as saying "This is probably not the best time to be looking for public money, so I know we are not going to get the built paths like the West Highland Way or the Great Glen Way. But joining up the core path network that Highland Council had to develop for access under the land reform legislation would be feasible". The project also received support from John Thurso, then the MP for Caithness, Sutherland and Easter Ross. However, Highlands and Islands Enterprise, who the Dunnet Head Educational Trust had had discussions with, stated in 2010 that the project did not fit its remit for funding.

In October 2013, Ms Irving told The Press and Journal that she thought Highland Council was using "delaying tactics" to avoid providing £14,500 to further develop and market the route, because it did not want to spend money in Caithness. It was reported that Ms Irving had 32 businesses signed up to support the project, and had produced marketing materials to the cost of £4,500. Irving claimed that she had received three different answers about how to go about requesting funds from the council in three months, but a spokesperson for the council told the newspaper that while it was willing to support the project, it had received no formal grant application and that it could not retrospectively fund the promotional materials Irving had already paid for.

In October 2014, MsIrving told The Herald that a route had been identified on the website, Walking World, but that work was required on conducting a feasibility study, consultation with landowners, a business plan and market studies. The feasibility study and business plan have now been completed but are not in the public domain.  A Friends of the North Highland Way group has been formed to raise money from people using the route, for investment in promotional activities. A Highland Council spokesperson told The Herald that the council had been approached for support in late 2013 by Brough Bay Ltd, "as they were unable to continue undertaking the level of work that would be required if this was purely on a voluntary basis".  The lack of economic and business sense is astounding.  Of course the company was not going to do it free of charge.  The spokesperson reported that: "Although unable to assist in terms of providing direct funding to an individual company, the council did recognise that the idea had great potential for the area so agreed to explore other options". According to the council, attempts to bring local community representatives together had been unsuccessful and "there had been indications that most were not willing to be part of a group to lead the project at this time". Highlands and Islands Enterprise was reported as stating that "We have held informal discussions regarding the North Highland Way but have not received any formal application for assistance".A formal application for funding was made to HIE, but was dependent on them receiving the feasibility study and business plan free of charge.

In April 2015, it was reported that Ms Irving, along with a number of local businesses, was attempting to have the route recognised as a National Trail. A local walking tours company, Easyways, was planning to start taking bookings from May 2015. , Easyways lists  the route as a holiday on its website, although it notes that the route is not currently waymarked.

Trail Connections 
The North Highland Way connects to two other long-distance routes:
John o' Groats Trail at John o' Groats and Duncansby Head
Cape Wrath Trail at Cape Wrath

References

Further reading

External links 
 https://www.amazon.co.uk/Books-Tina-Irving/s?rh=n%3A266239%2Cp_27%3ATina+Irving  
  https://osmaps.ordnancesurvey.co.uk/route/4222509/Friends-of-the-North-Highland-Way-Thurso-to-Castletown
 https://www.letsgoexploring.co.uk
 https://getoutside.ordnancesurvey.co.uk/guides/winter-wonderland/
 The North Highland Way Website
 Guided walk along the North Highland Way
 Details of the route of the North Highland Way
 walkingworld.com
 The Caithness Waybaggers
 Mary Anne's Cottage
 More Details of the route of the North Highland Way

Long-distance footpaths in Scotland
Footpaths in Highland (council area)